The Live Earth concert in South Africa was held at the Coca-Cola Dome, South Africa on 7 July 2007.

Running order
South African Drum Cafe Team - "Zimbabwe Drum Rhythm" (JB 2:18)
Danny K and The Soweto Gospel Choir - "Something Inside So Strong", "Homeless", "Real Man", "Unfrozen", "Shorty" (JB 17:00)
Baaba Maal - "African Woman", "Gorel", "Mbaye" (JB 17:45)
Zola - "Ghetto Scandalous", "Mzion", "Nomhle", "Mdlwembe", "Don't Cry" (JB 18:30)
The Parlotones - "Dragonflies and Astronauts", "Overexposed", "Here Comes a Man", "Louder Than Bombs" (JB 19:15)
Vusi Mahlasela - "Thulamama/Red Song", "When You Come Back", "River Jordan" (JB 20:00)
Angelique Kidjo - 2 songs with unknown titles, "Afrika", "Tumba", "Gimme Shelter" (duet with Joss Stone) (JB 20:45)
Joss Stone - "Girl They Won't Believe It", "Headturner","Tell Me What We're Gonna Do Now", "Music", "Tell Me 'Bout It", "Right To Be Wrong" (JB 21:30)
UB40 - "Food For Thought", "Who You Fighting For", "One in Ten", "Kingston Town", "Kiss and Say Goodbye", "Red Red Wine", "Higher Ground", "Wear You To The Ball", "Sing Our Own Song", "Johnny Too Bad", "So Here I Am", "Can't Help Falling in Love" (JB 22:15)

Presenters:
Naomi Campbell
DJ Suga

Coverage

Online
MSN was responsible for the online broadcasting of the concert.

References

External links
Official Live Earth Web Site
MSN Live Earth Site
Official Live Earth blog

Johannesburg
Rock festivals in South Africa
2007 in South Africa
21st century in Johannesburg
Culture of Johannesburg
Environmentalism in South Africa
July 2007 events in South Africa